Jason Rudd (born April 15, 1979) is an American former professional stock car racing driver. Last racing for Means Racing in the NASCAR Busch Series, Rudd never ran a full-time season. He is the nephew of former NASCAR Cup Series driver Ricky Rudd.

Career
Rudd started his NASCAR career in 1999, trying and failing to qualify for both Richmond races in the NASCAR Busch Series. After not trying to run any races in 2000, Rudd returned to NASCAR competition in 2001, racing for teams such as Means Racing, HighLine Performance Group, PRW Racing, and his grandfather Al Rudd's team. Rudd finished the season with a highest finish of 31st, and failing to qualify for two races, both while racing for his grandfather's team.

In 2002, Rudd moved down to ARCA, racing for his own team for six races. He would rack up 1 top-5 and 3 top-tens in the six races he raced in. He finished the series 32nd in the overall standings. In 2003, Rudd returned to the Busch series, driving a race for JD Motorsports and Moy Racing each. However, he also failed to qualify for 3 races, racing for himself.

In 2004, Rudd returned to both the Busch Series and ARCA. In the Busch series, he raced a single race for Means Racing, staying in the race for 8 laps before dropping out because of a vibration. Rudd's ARCA season didn't go quite as planned either, since although he made the two races he tried to race in, he was caught in a wreck early in the first race, and retired with a blown engine in the other.

In 2005, Rudd did not race in either series, but instead decided to try his shot at the NASCAR Craftsman Truck Series, but failed to qualify in both races he attempted. He has not attempted to run another NASCAR race since.

Motorsports career results

NASCAR
(key) (Bold – Pole position awarded by qualifying time. Italics – Pole position earned by points standings or practice time. * – Most laps led.)

Busch Series

Craftsman Truck Series

ARCA Re/Max Series
(key) (Bold – Pole position awarded by qualifying time. Italics – Pole position earned by points standings or practice time. * – Most laps led.)

References

External links
 
 

Living people
1979 births
NASCAR drivers
Sportspeople from Chesapeake, Virginia
ARCA Menards Series drivers
Racing drivers from Virginia